Herbie Faye (February 2, 1899 – June 28, 1980) was an American actor and vaudeville comedian who appeared in both of Phil Silvers' CBS television series, The Phil Silvers Show (1955–1959) and The New Phil Silvers Show (1963–1964). Faye died June 28, 1980 from heart failure.

Career
Faye worked with Mildred Harris in vaudeville, with Silvers as one of the supporting cast. His relationship with Silvers began in 1928 when Silvers was the straight man in Faye's act.

On Broadway, Faye appeared in Top Banana (1951) and Wine, Women and Song (1942).

In movies, Faye appeared in 1956 as Max in The Harder They Fall, a boxing story starring Humphrey Bogart in his last role. In 1961, he appeared as a cook in the comedy film Snow White and the Three Stooges. In 1962, he portrayed Charlie the bartender, in another boxing film Requiem for a Heavyweight, starring Anthony Quinn.

Filmography

Film

Television

References

External links

1899 births
1980 deaths
American male television actors
American male stage actors
American male film actors
People from Greater Los Angeles
People from the Las Vegas Valley
Male actors from New York City
20th-century American male actors
Jewish American male actors
Jewish American male comedians
20th-century American Jews